"Goodnight, Sweetheart" is a British popular song written in 1931. It has been performed by Al Bowlly, Kate Smith, Connie Francis (for her 1959 album My Thanks to You), Dick Haymes (for his Imagination album), Gordon MacRae (for his 1957 album Motion Picture Soundstage), Sarah Vaughan (for her 1962 album Sarah + 2) and Dean Martin (for his 1958 album Sleep Warm), among others, and was the theme song for the 1990s BBC time-travel sitcom Goodnight Sweetheart starring Nicholas Lyndhurst, which was named after it.

"Goodnight, Sweetheart" was written in 1931 by the song-writing team of Ray Noble, Jimmy Campbell and Reg Connelly.

It was recorded in 1931 by the Wayne King Orchestra (vocals by Ernie Birchill), Russ Columbo, Bing Crosby,  Ruth Etting and the Ray Noble Orchestra (vocals by Al Bowlly). Guy Lombardo also recorded his own version of the song in 1931 with vocals by Carmen Lombardo. Lombardo's version remained at No. 1 for a number of weeks in the U.S. charts.

In film, the song was performed in Angel's Holiday with Jane Withers (1937),The Palm Beach Story (1942; performed by Rudy Vallée), Stage Door Canteen (1943; sung by Kenny Baker), and Holiday in Mexico (1946; excerpt sung by Walter Pidgeon and Jane Powell). It was also featured in the Star Trek episode "The City on the Edge of Forever".

References

External links
Songs of Guy Lombardo

1931 songs
Wayne King songs
Songs written by Jimmy Campbell and Reg Connelly
Songs written by Ray Noble
Al Bowlly songs
Guy Lombardo songs